Tanners may refer to:
 Tanners (company), a British wine company
 Tanners, Virginia, an unincorporated community located in Madison County, United States
 Jerald and Sandra Tanner, opponents of the LDS Church (Mormons)
 Leatherhead F.C., a football (soccer) club in Leatherhead, England
 a nickname for Peabody Veterans Memorial High School, a public high school located in Peabody, Massachusetts

See also
 Tanner (disambiguation)
 Tanners' Bridge, an 18th-century Ottoman period stone footbridge located in Tirana, Albania
 List of Full House characters 
 List of ALF characters